"Don't Ask Me Why" is a song first recorded by Elvis Presley as part of the soundtrack for his 1958 motion picture King Creole.

It was written by Fred Wise (lyrics) and Ben Weisman (music).

In 1958 the song was released on a single as a flipside to "Hard Headed Woman", another song from the same movie. In the United States "Don't Ask Me Why" peaked at number 25 on the Billboard Hot 100, while "Hard Headed Woman" was number 1 for two weeks.

The single "Hard Headed Woman / Don't Ask Me Why" was among the most popular singles of the whole year 1958 in the United States: Billboard ranked it number 49 on the year-end Popular chart (a recapitulation of the Billboard's Pop Singles chart for the year) and number 17 on the year-end Country and Western chart (a recapitulation of the Billboard's C&W chart). The single was certified Planinum by the RIAA.

Charts

Year-end charts (single "Heard Headed Woman / Don't Ask Me Why")

Cover versions
Wanda Jackson covered this song on her 1962 album Wonderful Wanda.

References

External links 
 Elvis Presley – Hard Headed Woman / Don't Ask Me Why at Discogs



1958 songs
1958 singles
Elvis Presley songs
RCA Records singles
Songs with lyrics by Fred Wise (songwriter)
Songs with music by Ben Weisman